Robert Hudson Borwick, 1st Baron Borwick (21 January 1845 – 27 January 1936), known as Sir Robert Borwick from 1902 to 1916, and as Sir Robert Borwick, 1st Baronet from 1916 to 1922, was a British businessman and a Justice of the Peace for the County of London.

Biography

Borwick was the son of George Borwick of Torquay, and his wife Jane (née Hudson), and was Chairman of the family firm George Borwick & Sons Ltd, manufacturer of baking and custard powders, which had been founded by his father.

Robert Borwick was made a Knight Bachelor in the 1902 Birthday Honours and knighted by King Edward VII at Buckingham Palace on 18 December 1902. He was created a Baronet (in the Baronetage of the United Kingdom), of Eden Lacy in the County of Lancaster, in 1916.

In 1922 he was further honoured when he was raised to the peerage as Baron Borwick, of Hawkshead in the County of Lancaster, for "providing hospital treatment for the sick and wounded Colonial officers throughout the war".

He was also a Knight of Grace of the Order of St. John of Jerusalem.

Lord Borwick married in 1872, Caroline (d. April 1936), daughter of the Reverend Richard Daniel Johnston of Kurnool, India. They had two sons and seven daughters. Latterly the family resided almost continually in Nice and Paris.

He died in January 1936, aged 91, and was succeeded in his titles by his eldest son George, 2nd Baron Borwick. He is buried in the Cimetière du Château in Nice.

References

Sources
 Whittaker's Peerage, Baronetage, Knightage, and Companionage, London, 1935, p. 154.
 Kidd, Charles, & Williamson, David, (editors), Debrett's Peerage and Baronetage, St. Martin's Press, New York City, 1990.

1845 births
1936 deaths
Knights Bachelor
1
Borwick, Robert, Ist Baron
Borwick, Robert, Ist Baron
People from Hawkshead
Barons created by George V
English justices of the peace